Josh Reichmann is a Canadian indie rock singer-songwriter and filmmaker.

Biography
Formerly associated with the band Tangiers, since that band's breakup he has performed under the stage name Jewish Legend. He released his debut album as Jewish Legend, Telepathy Now!, in 2006.

Tangiers first record – Hot New Spirits was named in the top 10 Canadian records of the decade by Maclean'''s Magazine.

His song "Tigris River" reached number one on CBC Radio 3's weekly chart show, The R3-30, in January 2007.

He went on to release the 2008 Life is Legal EP as Josh Reichmann Oracle Band and followed this with the full-length Crazy Power in 2009, both on the Paper Bag Records label.

In 2009 he covered Bat for Lashes' song "Daniel" for The Seven Year Itch, a Paper Bag Records cover compilation.

Reichmann released the record After Live on Hand Drawn Dracula in 2011 to local and national critical acclaim.

In 2011 Reichmann opened the clothing boutique and cultural hub "Ruins" with his partner Mikey Apples on Queen St. West in Toronto. The store featured clothes by Opening Ceremony, Patrek Ervell, Thomas and Assembly NYC and other forward looking international brands. Ruins launched its own in house clothing line in 2012. Ruins closed in 2013 as Reichmann moved into other media projects including screen writing and motion pictures. His debut feature film Tenzin'', co-directed with Michael LeBlanc, premiered in 2021 at the Tallinn Black Nights Film Festival prior to commercial release in 2022.

He attended Etobicoke School of the Arts (ESA).

References

Canadian rock singers
Canadian male singers
Canadian singer-songwriters
Jewish Canadian musicians
Living people
Musicians from Toronto
Film directors from Toronto
Paper Bag Records artists
Year of birth missing (living people)
Canadian male singer-songwriters